The National Library of Vietnam is the national library in Vietnam and it is located in Hanoi. It was established by a decree of 29 November 1917 as the central library of Indochina.

It took the successive names of Pierre Pasquier (28 February 1935), Bibliothèque Nationale (National Library, 20 October 1945), Bibliothèque Centrale de Hanoï (Central Library of Hanoi, February 1947) before being given its present name at 21 November 1958.

Website and digital collections 
The library website is available in Vietnamese, English and French. It provides the latest news concerning the library and gives details about recent library events and activities.
The website also provides information about digital collections. These collections include: 
 Doctoral theses
 Indochina books
 Books, maps about Hanoi
 Sino-Nom books
 Tapes, CD-ROMS
 English books about Vietnam

See also 
 List of national libraries

References

External links 
 

Vietnam
Libraries in Vietnam
Public libraries
Buildings and structures in Hanoi
Libraries established in 1917